Queen Sirikit Gallery or Queens Gallery is an art museum in Bangkok, Thailand.

The gallery was established in 2003 after a request by Queen Sirikit of Thailand. She named the exhibition center "The Queen Sirikit Arts Exhibition Center" in Thai, and "The Queen's Gallery" in English. The Queen's Gallery Foundation was established on 6 May 2003, and the queen presided at the official opening on 9 August 2003.

The gallery has  of floor space in a five-storey building.

References

Museums in Bangkok
Art museums established in 2003
2003 establishments in Thailand